The monkeypox virus (MPV, MPXV, or hMPXV), also called the mpox virus, is a species of double-stranded DNA virus that causes mpox in humans and other mammals. the monkeypox virus is a zoonotic virus belonging to the orthopoxvirus genus, making it closely related to the variola (VARV), cowpox (CPX), and vaccinia (VACV) viruses. MPV is oval-shaped with a lipoprotein outer membrane. The genome is approximately 190 kb.

The smallpox and monkeypox viruses are both orthopoxviruses, and the smallpox vaccine is effective against mpox if given within 3–5 years before contracting the disease. The clinical presentation of mpox is similar to smallpox, but with a milder rash and lower mortality rate. The virus is transmissible between animals and humans by direct contact to the lesions or bodily fluids. The virus was given the name monkeypox virus after being isolated from monkeys, but most of the carriers of this virus are rodents.

Variation in virulence of the virus has been observed in isolates from Central Africa, where strains are more virulent than those from Western Africa. The two areas have distinct clades of the virus, termed Clade I, formerly the Congo Basin (Central African) clade, and Clade II, formerly the West African clade. Though there are many natural hosts for the monkeypox virus, the exact reservoirs and how the virus is circulated in nature needs to be studied further.

Virology

Classification 
MPV is part of the genus Orthopoxvirus, belonging to the Poxviridae family, which have been listed by the WHO as diseases with epidemic or pandemic potential. There are two major clades one from the Congo Basin and the other one has been endemic to the West Africa region. The Congo Basin clade has been found to be more virulent and deadly with a reproductive number of 0.6 to 1.0.

MPV is 96.3% identical to the variola virus in regards to its coding region, but it does differ in parts of the genome which encode for virulence and host range. Through phylogenetic analysis, it was found that MPV is not a direct descendent of the variola virus.

Structure and genome 
The monkeypox virus, like other poxviruses, is oval shaped, with a lipoprotein outer membrane. The outer membrane protects the enzymes, DNA, and transcription factors of the virus. Typical DNA viruses replicate and express their genome in the nucleus of eukaryotic cells. They heavily rely on the host cell's machinery; however, the monkeypox viruses rely mostly on the protein encoded in their genome that allows them to replicate in the cytoplasm.

Genome of the monkeypox virus is around 200kb long coding for approximately 200 proteins. It has double stranded DNA which presents in a linear shape with covalently closed hairpin ends; the 3’ and 5’ ends are not free. Similar to other poxviruses, the virions of monkey pox have large oval shaped envelopes. Within each virion there is a core which holds the genome along with the enzymes that assist in dissolving the protein coat and replication. The center of the genome codes for genes involved in key functions such as viral transcription and assembly; genes located on the extremities of the viral genome are associated more towards interactions between the virus and the host cell such as spike protein characteristics.

The monkeypox DNA genome consists of approximately 197 kb with 190 non-overlapping Open Reading Frames (ORFs). The monkeypox virus contains a conserved coding region, with variable inverted terminal repeats at each end.

Monkeypox virus is relatively large compared to other viruses. This makes it harder for the virus to breach the host defenses, such as crossing past gap junctions. Furthermore, the large size makes it harder for the virus to quickly replicate and evade immune response. To evade host immune systems, and buy more time for replication, the monkeypox and other orthopox viruses have evolved to evade host immune cells by coding for both intracellular and extracellular modulatory proteins.The monkeypox virus has multiple surface proteins that facilitate its entry into host cells; the virus can use 11-12 transmembrane proteins to merge with the host cells. It likely binds to glycosaminoglycans or laminin on the cell surface.

Due to it being a DNA virus the virus is less likely to mutate compared to RNA viruses such as SARS-COV-2.

Replication and life cycle 
As an Orthopoxvirus, MPV replication occurs entirely in the cell cytoplasm within 'factories'- created from the host rough endoplasmic reticulum (ER)- where viral mRNA transcription and translation also take place. The factories are also where DNA replication, gene expression, and mature virions (MV) are created.

MVs are able to bind to the cell surface with the help of viral proteins. Virus entry into the host cell plasma membrane is dependent on a neutral pH, otherwise entry occurs via a low-pH dependent endocytic route. The MV of the monkeypox virus has an Entry Fusion Complex (EFC), allowing it to enter the host cell after attachment.

Translation of mRNA into structural virions occurs using the host ribosomes. Gene expression begins when MPV releases viral proteins and enzymatic factors that disable the cell. Mature virions are infectious, however, they will stay inside the cell, until they are transported from the factories to the Golgi/endosomal comportment. Protein synthesis allows for the ER membrane of the factory to dismantle, while small two lipid bilayer membranes will appear to encapsulate the genomes of new virions, now extracellular viruses (EVs). The VPS52 and VPS54 genes of the GARP complex, which is important for transport, are necessary for wrapping the virus, and formation of EVs. DNA concatemers process the genomes, which appear in new virions, along with other enzymes, and genetic information needed for the replication cycle to occur. EVs are necessary for the spread of the virus from cell-to-cell and its long-distance spread.

Transmission

Animal to human 
Zoonotic transmission can occur from direct contact with the blood, bodily fluids, wounds, or mucosal lesions of infected animals whether they are dead or alive. The virus is thought to have originated in Africa where evidence of the virus has been observed in multiple animals ranging from rope squirrels, tree squirrels, Gambian pouched rats, dormice, different species of monkeys. Though the natural reservoir of the monkeypox virus has not yet been established, rodents are speculated to be the most likely reservoir. Eating meat that has not been properly cooked and consuming other products of infected animals proves to be a major risk factor in the spread of infection.

Human to human 

Anthropogenic spread of the mpox is attributed to close contact with respiratory secretions and skin lesions of infected people or contaminated surfaces. For the virus to propagate through inhalation of contaminated air droplets, prolonged face to face contact is required. Pregnant women can spread the virus to their fetus through the placenta. In the United States, men are more disproportionately infected by the virus primarily during intercourse. The effective reproduction number of mpox has been found to be the highest in the United States, estimated as 1.55 (95% CrI: 1.42, 1.73). This means a single infected person is, on average, spreading it to 1.55 people.

The incubation period is between generally between 6 and 13 days; however, can range anywhere from 5 to 21 days. Prodromal symptoms include swelling of lymph nodes, muscle pain, headache, fever, prior to the emergence of the rash.

Difference in modes of virulence 
The MPV virus is primarily transmitted through direct contact, infection from respiratory droplets is much lower. These two different modes of transmission also determines the host cells that are targeted by the MPV virus.

Mpox

Signs and symptoms 
Signs and symptoms of mpox usually present themselves after the incubation period which can range from 5–21 days but is most commonly in the range of 6–13 days. Being a self-limited virus, the symptoms of mpox in humans does not typically last longer than 4 weeks but can vary in severity depending on several factors including age of the patient and extent of time exposed to the virus. Children and immunocompromised patients are more likely to experience severe symptoms when exposed and infected with mpox. Mpox has many similar symptoms to other pox viruses in the infection period including fever, headaches, back pain, muscle pains and an intense lack of energy. A sign unique to mpox compared to other pox viruses is lymphadenopathy, or swelling of the lymph nodes, particularly in the mandibular, cervical, or inguinal regions. Skin lesions typically present themselves on patients within 3 days of experiencing fever where they affect the face in an overwhelming majority of cases and other extremities of the body before affecting the trunk. The rash gradually develops on the body progressing from macules to pustules over a period of time eventually crusting over and falling off, sometimes sloughing off a portion of skin depending on the number of lesions and the severity of the case.

Prevention 
Because of the close relation of monkeypox virus to other poxviruses such as smallpox, many of the same vaccines that have been proven to protect against smallpox are presumed to protect against mpox as well. These presumptions about the effectiveness of smallpox vaccines for the use of treating mpox are not yet conclusive, as smallpox vaccinations have stopped being administered in many countries, like the United States, after the virus was deemed to have been eradicated. Still, the CDC has made a recommendation for those considered at high risk for infection by the monkeypox virus to consider receiving a smallpox vaccine. There are three existing smallpox vaccines in the US Strategic National Stockpile, two of which, JYNNEOS and ACAM2000, are licensed for protection against smallpox. The JYNNEOS vaccine is a two-dose vaccine that was developed to fight and protect against both smallpox and mpox, while the ACAM2000 is a vaccine that was developed to protect against smallpox but has been approved to help protect against mpox as well. People who have had close contact with other humans or animals that were shown to have mpox are recommended to get vaccinated. Other prevention recommendations from the CDC are to avoid interacting with or touching materials that have been touched by an infected animal or human as well as to rinse your hands with soap and water following exposure or contact with an infected animal or human.

Treatment 
As a self-limited disease, mpox generally does not require treatment in the majority of people who acquire it. In general, most patients with mpox will recover within 2–4 weeks without treatment. While fatality rate associated with mpox is significantly lower than other poxviruses like smallpox (~ 30%), the fatality rate associated with mpox is regionally variable and ranges from less than 1% to as high as 11%. Thus, treatment options are often necessary for individuals who are immunocompromised or have a higher risk for severe disease. Currently, there are no FDA-approved treatments for mpox specifically. There are, however, FDA-approved antivirals that are designed to treat smallpox and are thought to potentially be able to treat mpox in humans as well. The treatment of choice for smallpox in humans is Tecovirimat (TPOXX). TPOXX has not been approved by the FDA for treatment against mpox, but has been approved by the CDC to be used as a form of early treatment against non-variola orthopoxvirus infections, which includes mpox, under an Investigational New Drug (EA-IND) protocol.

Immune system interaction 
Pox viruses have mechanisms to evade the hosts' innate and adaptive immune systems. When infected human fibroblast cells have been observed to show cytopathic changes, but gene expression of the host cell remains unchanged. Interferon produced by human fibroblast cells were not sufficient to slow viral replication. The monkeypox virus  gene BR-209 is an interleukin-1β (IL-1β) inhibitor that prevents interaction with the receptor. The viral complement control protein (CCP), also known as MOPICE, a virulence factor, allows the virus to evade neutralization, opsonization, viral particle lysis, and phagocytosis.

The monkey pox virus can prevent apoptosis in infected cells by targeting apoptotic pathways; the mechanism is still under research. Moreover, the monkey pox virus can evade cytotoxicity mediated by t-cell and natural killer cells by producing MHC classI-like protein(OMCP) which resembles MHC class I module and it binds to NKG2D.  Natural killer T cells continually survey cells with NKG2D for absence of MHC class I proteins; the monkeypox virus with its OMCP passes the check. The virus also produces other proteins that further block cytotoxic activities. Evading the host immune system is crucial because of how large the monkeypox virus is.

In short, MPV has a unique immune system, MHC dependent, evasion tactic to evade antiviral CD4+ and CD8+ T cell responses.

Variants and clades
The virus is subclassified into two main clades, the Central African/Congo Basin clade (CA) and the West African clade (WA). The World Health Organization uses Roman numerals to denote each clade and a lowercase Latin script letter for subclades.

At the protein level, the CA clade and WA clade share 170 orthologs, and their transcriptional regulatory sequences show no significant differences. Both clades have 53 common virulence genes, which contain different types of amino acid changes. 121 of the amino acid changes in the virulence genes are silent, while 61 are conservative, and 93 are non-conservative.

Both clades vary in virulence, with the CA clade having more human-human transmission, and having a higher mortality rate in non-vaccinated people. The WA clade was thought to be less transmissible between humans. The 2022–2023 mpox outbreak was caused by the WA clade of the virus.

Distribution

Monkeypox virus is carried by various animals, including primates, and causes disease in both primates and in other animals. It was first identified by Preben von Magnus in Copenhagen, Denmark, in 1958 in crab-eating macaque monkeys (Macaca fascicularis) being used as laboratory animals. The virus was given the name monkeypox virus after being isolated from monkeys, but most of the carriers of this virus are rodents. 

The virus is mainly found in the tropical forests of Central Africa and West Africa.

The virus was first discovered in humans in 1970. Between 1970 and 1986, over 400 cases in humans were reported. Small viral outbreaks with  secondary human-to-human infection occur routinely in equatorial Central and West Africa.  The primary route of infection is thought to be contact with the infected animals or their bodily fluids. The first reported outbreak outside Africa occurred in 2003 in the Midwestern United States in Illinois, Indiana, and Wisconsin, with one occurrence in New Jersey. The 2003 outbreak in the United States was traced to prairie dogs infected from an imported Gambian pouched rat from Ghana.  A significant outbreak in Nigeria occurred in 2017.

Research 
The monkeypox virus is a highly complex virus and is not yet fully understood. Many laboratories across the globe continue to study the virus as it has been spreading significantly outside of its endemic areas. Pathologic examination of the virus are carefully being done on formalin-fixed or inactivated tissues. One study done by Manes et al. inoculated a MPV strain obtained from the CDC into HeLa cells. The original strain was obtained from a victim of the virus. Most of our current understanding of the monkeypox virus stems from the knowledge cultivated from studying the variola virus.

Moreover, there are multiple sites conducting epidemiological analysis on the spread of the disease and its evolution as new variants arise. Like the public extinction of smallpox through a global coordinated effort of vaccination, it may be possible to drive the monkeypox virus into extinction with effective vaccination due to its relatively low virulence.

See also 
 2022–2023 mpox outbreak

References

External links 

 CDC Questions and Answers About Monkeypox
 CDC – Human Monkeypox – Kasai Oriental, Zaire, 1996–1997
 CDC – Outbreak of Human Monkeypox, Democratic Republic of Congo, 1996 to 1997
 CDC Preliminary Report: Multistate Outbreak of Monkeypox in Persons Exposed to Pet Prairie Dogs
 National Library of Medicine – Monkeypox virus
 Virology.net Picturebook: Monkeypox
 Viralzone: Orthopoxvirus
 Virus Pathogen Database and Analysis Resource (ViPR): Poxviridae
 World Health Organization to rename the Monkeypox Virus

Chordopoxvirinae
Mpox